Admiral Claës Fabian Tamm (13 November 1879 – 4 October 1955) was a Swedish Navy officer. He served as the Chief of the Navy from 1939 to 1945.

Early life
Tamm was born on 13 November 1879 in Film, Uppsala County, Sweden, the son of the Governor of Stockholm and cabinet minister, Baron Claës Gustaf Adolf Tamm and his wife Ebba (née Tersmeden).

Career
Tamm was commissioned as a naval officer with the rank of acting sub-lieutenant in the Swedish Navy in 1899 and was promoted to sub-lieutenant in 1901. Tamm was promoted to lieutenant in 1907 and was adjutant and librarian at the Royal Swedish Naval Academy as well as teacher in law of war and maritime law from 1907 to 1910 and in naval warfare from 1910. He was adjutant at the Military Office of the Ministry for Naval Affairs from 1911. Tamm was naval attaché in Berlin and Copenhagen from 1914 to 1917, secretary in Royal Swedish Society of Naval Sciences from 1918 to 1921 and was head of the Royal Swedish Naval Academy from 1921 to 1925.

Tamm was then head of department at the Naval Staff in 1926, was promoted to captain in 1927 and was a member of the Defense Committee in 1928 and 1929. He was appointed flag captain in 1930 and was an expert at the World Disarmament Conference in Geneva in 1932. Tamm was head of the Military Office of the Naval Defence (Sjöförsvarets kommandoexpedition)  from 1931 to 1933 and Chief of the Coastal Fleet from 1933 to 1939. He was promoted to vice admiral in 1939 and was Chief of the Navy from 1939 to 1945. He was appointed admiral in the reserve in 1947, two years after he left active service.

In addition to his military activities, Tamm was chairman of the board of Ströms Bruks AB, Ljusne-Woxna AB and Rederi AB Svea (1945–52). Tamm was also chairman of the board of the Association of Army, Navy and Air Film (Föreningen Armé- Marin- och Flygfilm) from 1932 to 1939 and board member of AB Finnboda Varv.

Personal life
In 1908, Tamm married baroness Eva Ebba Gustafva Beck-Friis (1884–1963), daughter of baron Carl Joachim Beck-Friis and baroness Anna von Otter. Tamm died in 1955 and was buried at Galärvarvskyrkogården in Stockholm.

Dates of rank

1899 – Acting sub-lieutenant
1901 – Sub-lieutenant
1907 – Lieutenant
1918 – Commander
1927 – Captain
1933 – Rear admiral
1939 – Vice admiral
1947 – Admiral

Awards and decorations
Tamm's awards:

Swedish
  Commander Grand Cross of the Order of the Sword
  Knight of the Order of the Polar Star
  Knight of the Order of Vasa
  King Gustaf V's Olympic commemorative medal (Konung Gustaf V:s olympiska minnesmedalj)
  Swedish Voluntary Motorboat Corps' Gold Medal (Sveriges frivilliga motorbåtskårs guldmedalj)

Foreign
  Grand Cross of the Order of the Crown of Italy
  Grand Cross of the Order of the Three Stars
  Grand Officer of the Order of the German Eagle
  Commander 1st Class of the Order of the Dannebrog
  Commander 1st Class of the Order of the White Rose of Finland
  Commander with Star of the Order of St. Olav
  Commander 1st Class of the Order of Polonia Restituta
  Commander 2nd Class of the Order of del Mérito Naval
  Officer of the Order of Saints Maurice and Lazarus
  Knight 1st Class of the Order of the Griffon
  Knight 3rd Class of the Order of the Crown
  Knight 3rd Class of the Order of St. Anna
  Finnish Defense Corps' cross of merit (Finska skyddskårernas förtjänstkors)

Honours
Member of the Royal Swedish Society of Naval Sciences (1914; honorary member in 1933)
Member of the Royal Swedish Academy of War Sciences (1925)

References

1879 births
1955 deaths
Swedish Navy admirals
People from Östhammar Municipality
Members of the Royal Swedish Academy of War Sciences
Members of the Royal Swedish Society of Naval Sciences
Swedish naval attachés
Burials at Galärvarvskyrkogården
Tamm family